Henry Kisekka (born 31 August 1989) is a Ugandan professional footballer who plays as a forward for I-League club Aizawl.

Club career
Regarded as an important asset to Dong Nai's attacking line in 2012, he recorded 11 goals, helping his team achieve promotion. Not much later, he received a call up to the Uganda squad ahead of the 2014 FIFA World Cup qualifying rounds.

Binh Duong F.C. canceled Henry Kisekka's contract in 2016.

Quang Nam

For six rounds, he did not score a goal but by round 9 he had hit 4 goals, making him eighth top scorer of the V.League by that time. This empowered him to score five more, increasing his tally to 9 goals by the end of the season.

Only scoring one goal for Quang Nam in 2015, his profligacy in front of goal forced him to return to Uganda in search for a club. One of his possibilities was Dong Nai F.C. to which he transferred in June 2015.

Gokulam Kerala
In February 2018, Kisekka joined I-League club Gokulam Kerala as a replacement for Nigerian Odafa Okolie, until the end of the season. On 4 February, he made his debut for the club in a 1–0 away loss, against NEROCA. He scored his first goal in the next match four days later, in the 90th minute and guided his side to victory against Mohun Bagan. He scored a sensational volley after his brilliant touch inside the box gave him time and space for the strike.

On 15 March, Kisekka scored a brace against NorthEast United in the qualifying round of the Super Cup, in a 2–0 win and helped his side enter into the round of 16. On 1 April, he scored again in the next round but in a lost cause as a late goal sealed a dramatic win for Bengaluru and knocked Gokulam Kerala out of the competition.

Kisekka finished the season with seven goals in nine appearances, in all competitions. His brief spell with the Malabarians was a treat to watch for the fans and plaudits alike. He linked well with Mahmood Al-Ajmi and compatriot Musa Mudde to provide goals to an attacking silhouette which looked lethal throughout the season.

Mohun Bagan
In July 2018, Kisekka switched to fellow league club Mohun Bagan. On 27 October, he made his debut for the club in a 1–1 draw, against former club Gokulam Kerala. He scored on his debut after he headed in the opener of the match.

In March 2019, Kisekka was released from Mohun Bagan after he had a season to forget and the club experienced their worst league season in over a decade.

Gokulam Kerala
In July 2019, Kisekka signed with his former club Gokulam Kerala after a year in Kolkata with Mohun Bagan. On 8 August, he scored on his first appearance of the season in a thumping 4–0 win against Chennaiyin B in the Durand Cup.

He played a crucial role in forging a formidable partnership with striker Marcus Joseph. Gokulam Kerala went on to clinch the Durand Cup and then followed that up with a semi-final finish at the Sheikh Kamal International Club Cup in Bangladesh, where he scored four goals in equal appearances.

On 30 November, he scored on his first I-League game back for Gokulam Kerala in a 2–1 win against NEROCA. He scored five goals in the league season which was stopped midway due to the COVID-19 pandemic in India.

Mohammedan
On 6 April 2022, it was announced that I-League club Mohammedan has completed the signing of Kisekka from local Kolkata-based side Bhawanipore. On 30 April, he scored his first goal for the Black Panthers against NEROCA. Under Nikola Stojanović's captaincy, his team for the first time, ran for their maiden national league title in 2021–22 I-League season, but finished as runners-up after a 2–1 defeat to Gokulam Kerala at the end.

Aizawl
On 21 September, ahead of the 2022–23 I-League season kickoff, Aizawl announced the signing of Kisekka. He made his debut for the club on 15 November against TRAU in an 1–1 draw.

Career statistics

Club

International

International goals
Scores and results list Uganda's goal tally first

Honours
Mohun Bagan
Calcutta Football League: 2018–19

Gokulam Kerala
Durand Cup: 2019

Mohammedan Sporting
I-League runner-up: 2021–22

References

External links

Henry Kisekka at Flashscore

Ugandan footballers
Ugandan expatriate footballers
Uganda international footballers
Association football forwards
Uganda Revenue Authority SC players
Hòa Phát Hà Nội FC players
Quang Nam FC players
Dong Nai FC players
Becamex Binh Duong FC players
Can Tho FC players
Gokulam Kerala FC players
Mohun Bagan AC players
V.League 1 players
V.League 2 players
I-League players
Expatriate footballers in Vietnam
Expatriate footballers in India
Ugandan expatriate sportspeople in Vietnam
Ugandan expatriate sportspeople in India
Living people
1989 births
People from Kampala
Calcutta Football League players